Frank Chamberlain may refer to:

Frank Noel Chamberlain (1900–1975), Bishop of Trinidad and Tobago
Frank Chamberlain (cricketer) (1925–2004), chairman of the Test and County Cricket Board in the 1990s
Frank O. Chamberlain (1829–1902), American farmer, hotel manager, and politician

See also
Francis Chamberlain (disambiguation)